Indirect presidential elections were held in Nepal in July 2008. The first round of voting was held on 19 July, with a run-off on 21 July. The Nepalese Constituent Assembly (CA) elected in April 2008 elected a new president and vice-president after the Fifth Amendment to the Interim Constitution was passed on 14 July. This would be the first President to be elected after Nepal became a republic a few months earlier.

In the newly passed amendment, the majority party will form the government, the CA will elect the new president on the basis of majority and a new provision that the Opposition Leader will be a member of the Constitutional Council. The leading political parties, Nepali Congress, Communist Party of Nepal (Maoist) and Communist Party of Nepal (United Marxist-Leninist) engaged in discussions regarding who would be the new president. The Nepali Congress wanted Prime Minister and interim Head of State Girija Prasad Koirala while the Communist Party of Nepal (United Marxist-Leninist) wanted its former Secretary-General Madhav Kumar Nepal as president. However, the Communist Party of Nepal (Maoist) wants an independent figure as president rather than party figures such as Koirala or Nepal. The Maoists won the most seats in the CA, though their party needs to form a coalition government with the other parties.

Organisation
The election is conducted by the Office of the Election Officer (OEO). On 16 July 2008 OEO released a voters list of 593 CA members. The CA was 601 seats in total, but by-elections are due in five constituencies and three CA members had not been sworn in at the time.

Candidates
On 9 June 2008, the CPN (Maoist) declared that five names from outside their party they would consider for the presidency:
Sahana Pradhan
Ram Raja Prasad Singh
Nara Bahadur Karmacharya
Padma Ratna Tuladhar
Devendra Raj Pandey.

Negotiations between CPN(Maoist) and CPN(UML) appeared to have broken down by 17 July 2008 so the three major parties all nominated their own candidates for president and vice-president. All three main presidential candidates were Madhesis. The largest Madhesi party, the MJF, announced that they'd support Singh as president, but nominated their own candidate for vice president.

On the day of the poll the CPN(UML) and MJF agreed to back the NC candidate for the presidency and the CPN(UML) and NC agreed to back the MJF candidate for the vice-presidency, thus nullifying the agreement the Maoists had with the three Madhesi parties.

Results
578 CA members participated in the poll on 19 July 2008. Rastriya Prajatantra Party, Rastriya Janamorcha, the Nepal Workers and Peasants Party and the Communist Party of Nepal (Unified) boycotted the election. The sole CA member of the Chure Bhawar Rastriya Ekta Party, Keshav Prasad Mainali, only participated in the vice-presidential poll.

On 19 July, Parmananda Jha was declared the first Vice President of Nepal. Jha received 305 votes beating his nearest rival Shanta Shrestha from the Communist Party of Nepal (Maoist) (CPN-M) with 243 votes. However, the President of Nepal could not be elected as neither candidate got a clear majority. Ram Baran Yadav received 283 votes and Ram Raja Prasad Singh won 270 votes. A run-off election was thus called for.

On 21 July, Ram Baran Yadav of the Nepali Congress, who was supported by the CPN (UML) and MJF, got support from around 308 Constituent Assembly members in 594 Constituent Assembly members. His rival was Ram Raja Prasad Singh, nominated by the CPN (M). Prasad won 282 votes. Earlier, during vice-presidential election and first round of presidential elections, Maoists had threatened to refuse to form a government if their choice for the presidency did not succeed as they feared that certain electoral pledges such as land reform would not able to pass. Kul Bahadur Gurung, the speaker of constituent assembly, declared Ram Yadav winner of second-round presidential election on Monday. Yadav would be the first President of Nepal after it became a republic. The new president will replace the deposed King Gyanendra as the head of the state.

President

Vice-President

References

External links
Election Commission of Nepal

President
Presidential elections in Nepal
History of Nepal (2008–present)
Nepal